A substantial car industry was created in Australia in the 20th century through the opening of Australian plants by international manufacturers. The first major carmaker was Ford Australia and the first Australian-designed mass production car was manufactured by Holden in 1948. Australian manufacture of cars rose to a maximum of almost half a million in the 1970s (10th place in the World) and still exceeded 400,000 in 2004. Australia was best known for the design and production of 'large' sized passenger vehicles. By 2009 total production had fallen to around 175,000 and the Australian market was dominated by cars imported from Asia and Europe.

As of 2015, Australian-designed cars were manufactured by General Motors subsidiary Holden, and Ford Australia, while Toyota Australia manufactured local variants of its international models, particularly the Camry. However, the Ford Australia engine and vehicle plants closed in October 2016 and the Holden and Toyota Australia factories closed in late 2017. Only Ford's design and development facilities remain in operation, leaving Australia as one of 13 countries with the capabilities to design and develop mass market cars from scratch. As of 2020, Holden has been shuttered and will no longer be sold as a GM brand.

History

Australian constructors were very active at the very beginning of both car and aircraft development and in some areas, ahead of their overseas counterparts. Due to the isolation of Australia, it was more practical for Australia to make their own cars.

The Highland was one of the first types of automobiles to be offered for sale in Australia, firstly in 1894 as a primitive motorised tricycle, then two years later as a four-wheeled, two-seater vehicle using bicycle components.

The first true cars made in Australia were steam cars. The first of these steam cars, the Phaeton, was made in 1896 by Herbert Thomson and Edward Holmes of Armadale, Melbourne. It was exhibited in 1900 using the first pneumatic tyres made in Australia by Dunlop. The 5 horsepower single cylinder steam carriage which is now in the Institute of Applied Sciences, Melbourne, was reliable and durable enough to take Thomson and a friend 493 miles from Bathurst to Melbourne at an average speed of 8.7 mp/h.

In 1900 Bruno Hammer built a one off automobile in Mount Torrens, South Australia.

In 1901 Harley Tarrant produced the first Tarrant automobile, which was the first petrol-driven car built entirely in Australia in a small workshop in Melbourne. Before that, Tarrant had been using the shop to build engines. Tarrant was joined in this endeavour by bicycle maker, Howard Lewis. The car was powered by a rear-mounted 6 hp Benz engine. This car was followed by many improved designs, including the first fully enclosed car body made in Australia. Later models included locally produced components including: engines, gearboxes and rear axles. The sole surviving Tarrant is on display at the RACV City Club, on the chancery level.

In 1903, the Australian Motoring Association was formed in New South Wales, South Australia and Victoria to protect the interests of motorists. In 1924, this was followed by the Australian Automobile Association.

On 31 March 1925, Ford announced that its Australian headquarters were to be at Geelong, Victoria. The first Australian-built Ford was a Model T launched in June 1925.

Tyre manufacture also existed in Australia. However, the last tyre factory closed in April 2010 when Bridgestone ceased production.

Historical data

Historical production

Source:, OICA

Historical sales
{| class="wikitable" style="text-align: center; width:98%; font-size:80%;" align="left"
|-
! colspan="11" |  Source : BSCB
X L Locally developed / manufactured / assembled / badged
|-
! style="width:4%;" rowspan="2" | Year !! style="width:90%;" colspan="10" | Models and Ranking 
|-
! style="width:9%;" | 1st !! style="width:9%;" | 2nd !! style="width:9%;" | 3rd !! style="width:9%;" | 4th !! style="width:9%;" | 5th !! style="width:9%;" | 6th !! style="width:9%;" | 7th !! style="width:9%;" | 8th !! style="width:9%;" | 9th !! style="width:9%;" | 10th
|-
| 1977 || style="background: #DCDCDC" | Ford Falcon L || style="background: #DCDCDC" | Holden Kingswood L || style="background: #E8D8FF" | Holden Torana/Sunbird L || style="background: #E8D8FF" | Datsun 180B/200B || style="background: #E8D8FF" | Toyota Corona/Celica L || colspan="5" | not available 
|-
| 1978 || style="background: #DCDCDC" | Holden Kingswood L || style="background: #DCDCDC" | Ford Falcon L || style="background: #E8D8FF" | Holden Torana/Sunbird L || style="background: #E8D8FF" | Chrysler Sigma L || style="background: #E8D8FF" | Ford Cortina L || style="background: #E8D8FF" | Datsun 200B L || style="background: #E8D8FF" | Toyota Corona/Celica L || style="background: #D9EBFF" | Toyota Corolla L || style="background: #D9EBFF" | Datsun 120Y L || not available 
|-
| 1979 || style="background: #E8D8FF" | Holden Commodore L || colspan="9" rowspan="3" | not available 
|-
| 1980 || style="background: #E8D8FF" | Holden Commodore L 
|-
| 1981 || style="background: #E8D8FF" | Holden Commodore L 
|-
| 1982 || style="background: #DCDCDC" | Ford Falcon L || style="background: #E8D8FF" | Holden Commodore L || style="background: #E8D8FF" | Mitsubishi Sigma L || style="background: #D9EBFF" | Ford Laser L || style="background: #E8D8FF" | Nissan Skyline || style="background: #D9EBFF" | Holden Gemini L || style="background: #D9EBFF" | Toyota Corolla L || style="background: #E8D8FF" | Holden Camira L || style="background: #E8D8FF" | Toyota Corona L || not available 
|-
| 1983 || style="background: #DCDCDC" | Ford Falcon L || style="background: #E8D8FF" | Holden Commodore L || style="background: #E8D8FF" | Holden Camira L || style="background: #E8D8FF" | Mitsubishi Sigma L || style="background: #D9EBFF" | Ford Laser L || colspan="5" | not available 
|-
| 1984 || style="background: #DCDCDC" | Ford Falcon L || style="background: #E8D8FF" | Holden Commodore L || style="background: #D9EBFF" | Ford Laser L || style="background: #E8D8FF" | Toyota Corona L || style="background: #E8D8FF" | Ford Telstar L || not available || style="background: #E8D8FF" | Holden Camira L || colspan="3" | not available 
|-
| 1985 || style="background: #DCDCDC" | Ford Falcon L || style="background: #E8D8FF" | Holden Commodore L || style="background: #D9EBFF" | Ford Laser L || style="background: #D9EBFF" | Toyota Corolla L || style="background: #E8D8FF" | Mitsubishi Magna L || colspan="5" | not available 
|-
| 1986 || style="background: #DCDCDC" | Ford Falcon L || style="background: #E8D8FF" | Holden Commodore L || style="background: #D9EBFF" | Ford Laser L || style="background: #E8D8FF" | Mitsubishi Magna L || style="background: #D9EBFF" | Toyota Corolla L || colspan="5" | not available 
|-
| 1987 || style="background: #DCDCDC" | Ford Falcon L || style="background: #E8D8FF" | Holden Commodore L || style="background: #E8D8FF" | Mitsubishi Magna L || style="background: #D9EBFF" | Ford Laser L || style="background: #E8D8FF" | Toyota Camry/Corona L || style="background: #D9EBFF" | Toyota Corolla L || style="background: #E8D8FF" | Nissan Pintara/Skyline L || colspan="3" | not available 
|-
| 1988 || style="background: #DCDCDC" | Ford Falcon L || style="background: #E8D8FF" | Holden Commodore L || style="background: #E8D8FF" | Mitsubishi Magna L || style="background: #E8D8FF" | Toyota Camry L || colspan="2" | not available || style="background: #D9EBFF" | Nissan Pulsar L || colspan="3" | not available 
|-
| 1989 || style="background: #DCDCDC" | Holden Commodore L || style="background: #DCDCDC" | Ford Falcon L || style="background: #E8D8FF" | Mitsubishi Magna L || style="background: #D9EBFF" | Ford Laser L || style="background: #E8D8FF" | Toyota Camry L || style="background: #D9EBFF" | Toyota Corolla L || colspan="4" | not available 
|-
| 1990 || style="background: #DCDCDC" | Holden Commodore L || style="background: #DCDCDC" | Ford Falcon L || style="background: #D9EBFF" | Ford Laser L || style="background: #E8D8FF" | Mitsubishi Magna L || style="background: #E8D8FF" | Toyota Camry L || colspan="5" | not available 
|-
| 1991 || style="background: #DCDCDC" | Holden Commodore L || style="background: #DCDCDC" | Ford Falcon L || style="background: #D9EBFF" | Ford Laser L || style="background: #E8D8FF" | Toyota Camry L || style="background: #E8D8FF" | Mitsubishi Magna L || colspan="5" | not available 
|-
| 1992 || style="background: #DCDCDC" | Ford Falcon L || style="background: #DCDCDC" | Holden Commodore L || style="background: #E8D8FF" | Mitsubishi Magna/Verada L || style="background: #E8D8FF" | Toyota Camry L || style="background: #D9EBFF" | Toyota Corolla L || style="background: #D9EBFF" | Ford Laser L || style="background: #D9EBFF" | Nissan Pulsar L || style="background: #FFE2B7" | Toyota HiLux || style="background: #E8D8FF" | Mazda 626 || not available 
|-
| 1993 || style="background: #DCDCDC" | Ford Falcon L || style="background: #DCDCDC" | Holden Commodore L || style="background: #E8D8FF" | Mitsubishi Magna/Verada L || style="background: #E8D8FF" | Toyota Camry/Vienta L || style="background: #D9EBFF" | Toyota Corolla L || style="background: #FFE2B7" | Toyota HiLux || style="background: #D9EBFF" | Ford Laser L || colspan="2" | not available || style="background: #D9EBFF" | Hyundai Excel 
|-
| 1994 || style="background: #DCDCDC" | Holden Commodore L || style="background: #DCDCDC" | Ford Falcon L || style="background: #E8D8FF" | Mitsubishi Magna/Verada L || style="background: #E8D8FF" | Toyota Camry/Vienta L || style="background: #E8D8FF" | Toyota Corolla L || style="background: #FFE2B7" | Toyota HiLux || style="background: #D9EBFF" | Hyundai Excel || colspan="3" | not available 
|-
| 1995 || style="background: #DCDCDC" | Ford Falcon L || style="background: #DCDCDC" | Holden Commodore L || style="background: #E8D8FF" | Toyota Camry/Vienta L || style="background: #E8D8FF" | Mitsubishi Magna/Verada L || style="background: #D9EBFF" | Hyundai Excel || colspan="2" | not available || style="background: #D9EBFF" | Ford Festiva L || colspan="2" | not available 
|-
| 1996 || style="background: #DCDCDC" | Holden Commodore L || style="background: #DCDCDC" | Ford Falcon L || style="background: #D9EBFF" | Hyundai Excel || colspan="6" | not available || style="background: #E8D8FF" | Daewoo 1.5i/Cielo 
|-
| 1997 || style="background: #DCDCDC" | Holden Commodore L || style="background: #DCDCDC" | Ford Falcon L || style="background: #E8D8FF" | Mitsubishi Magna/Verada L || style="background: #D9EBFF" | Hyundai Excel || colspan="4" | not available || style="background: #E8D8FF" | Nissan Pulsar || not available 
|-
| 1998 || style="background: #DCDCDC" | Holden Commodore L || style="background: #DCDCDC" | Ford Falcon L || style="background: #D9EBFF" | Hyundai Excel || style="background: #E8D8FF" | Toyota Camry/Vienta L || colspan="5" | not available || style="background: #E8D8FF" | Mitsubishi Lancer 
|-
| 1999 || style="background: #DCDCDC" | Holden Commodore L || style="background: #DCDCDC" | Ford Falcon L || style="background: #E8D8FF" | Toyota Camry/Vienta L || style="background: #D9EBFF" | Hyundai Excel || style="background: #E8D8FF" | Toyota Corolla L || style="background: #E8D8FF" | Mitsubishi Magna/Verada L || style="background: #E8D8FF" | Nissan Pulsar || not available || style="background: #FFE2B7" | Holden Rodeo L || not available 
|-
| 2000 || style="background: #DCDCDC" | Holden Commodore L || style="background: #DCDCDC" | Ford Falcon L || style="background: #E8D8FF" | Toyota Camry/Vienta L || style="background: #E8D8FF" | Toyota Corolla || style="background: #D9EBFF" | Hyundai Excel/Accent || colspan="3" | not available || style="background: #E8D8FF" | Mitsubishi Lancer || style="background: #E8D8FF" | Holden Astra L 
|-
| 2001 || style="background: #DCDCDC" | Holden Commodore L || style="background: #DCDCDC" | Ford Falcon L || style="background: #E8D8FF" | Toyota Corolla L || style="background: #E8D8FF" | Holden Astra L || style="background: #E8D8FF" | Toyota Camry/Vienta L || style="background: #E8D8FF" | Mitsubishi Magna/Verada L || style="background: #D9EBFF" | Hyundai Accent/Excel || colspan="3" | not available 
|-
| 2002 || style="background: #DCDCDC" | Holden Commodore L || style="background: #DCDCDC" | Ford Falcon L || style="background: #E8D8FF" | Toyota Corolla || style="background: #E8D8FF" | Toyota Camry L || style="background: #E8D8FF" | Holden Astra L || style="background: #E8D8FF" | Mitsubishi Magna/Verada L || style="background: #FFE2B7" | Toyota HiLux || colspan="3" | not available 
|-
| 2003 || style="background: #DCDCDC" | Holden Commodore L || style="background: #DCDCDC" | Ford Falcon L || style="background: #E8D8FF" | Toyota Camry L || style="background: #E8D8FF" | Toyota Corolla || style="background: #E8D8FF" | Holden Astra L || style="background: #FFE2B7" | Toyota HiLux || style="background: #E8D8FF" | Mitsubishi Magna/Verada L || style="background: #E8D8FF" | Mazda 323 || style="background: #FFE2B7" | Ford Falcon Ute L || style="background: #FFE2B7" | Holden Rodeo L 
|-
| 2004 || style="background: #DCDCDC" | Holden Commodore L || style="background: #DCDCDC" | Ford Falcon L || style="background: #E8D8FF" | Toyota Camry L || style="background: #E8D8FF" | Toyota Corolla || style="background: #FFE2B7" | Toyota HiLux || style="background: #E8D8FF" | Holden Astra L || style="background: #FFE2B7" | Holden Rodeo L || style="background: #FFE2B7" | Holden Commodore Ute L || style="background: #E8D8FF" | Mazda3 || style="background: #FFE2B7" | Ford Falcon Ute L 
|-
| 2005 || style="background: #DCDCDC" | Holden Commodore L || style="background: #DCDCDC" | Ford Falcon L || style="background: #E8D8FF" | Toyota Corolla || style="background: #E8D8FF" | Toyota Camry L || style="background: #E8D8FF" | Holden Astra L || style="background: #E8D8FF" | Mazda3 || style="background: #FFE2B7" | Toyota HiLux || not available || style="background: #FFD9D9" | Ford Territory L || not available 
|-
| 2006 || style="background: #DCDCDC" | Holden Commodore L || style="background: #E8D8FF" | Toyota Corolla || style="background: #DCDCDC" | Ford Falcon L || style="background: #FFE2B7" | Toyota HiLux || style="background: #E8D8FF" | Mazda3 || style="background: #E8D8FF" | Toyota Camry L || style="background: #D9EBFF" | Toyota Yaris || colspan="3" | not available 
|-
| 2007 || style="background: #DCDCDC" | Holden Commodore L || style="background: #E8D8FF" | Toyota Corolla || style="background: #FFE2B7" | Toyota HiLux || style="background: #E8D8FF" | Mazda3 || style="background: #DCDCDC" | Ford Falcon L || style="background: #D9EBFF" | Toyota Yaris || not available || style="background: #E8D8FF" | Toyota Aurion L || style="background: #E8D8FF" | Mitsubishi Lancer || not available 
|-
| 2008 || style="background: #DCDCDC" | Holden Commodore L || style="background: #E8D8FF" | Toyota Corolla || style="background: #FFE2B7" | Toyota HiLux || style="background: #E8D8FF" | Mazda3 || style="background: #DCDCDC" | Ford Falcon L || style="background: #D9EBFF" | Toyota Yaris || style="background: #E8D8FF" | Toyota Camry L || style="background: #E8D8FF" | Mitsubishi Lancer || not available || style="background: #FFE2B7" | Nissan Navara 
|-
| 2009 || style="background: #DCDCDC" | Holden Commodore L || style="background: #E8D8FF" | Toyota Corolla || style="background: #FFE2B7" | Toyota HiLux || style="background: #E8D8FF" | Mazda3 || style="background: #DCDCDC" | Ford Falcon L || style="background: #E8D8FF" | Hyundai i30 || colspan="4" | not available 
|-
| 2010 || style="background: #DCDCDC" | Holden Commodore L || style="background: #E8D8FF" | Toyota Corolla || style="background: #FFE2B7" | Toyota HiLux || style="background: #E8D8FF" | Mazda3 || style="background: #E8D8FF" | Hyundai i30 || style="background: #DCDCDC" | Ford Falcon L || style="background: #E8D8FF" | Holden Cruze L || colspan="3" | not available 
|-
| 2011 || style="background: #E8D8FF" | Mazda3 || style="background: #DCDCDC" | Holden Commodore L || style="background: #FFE2B7" | Toyota HiLux || style="background: #E8D8FF" | Toyota Corolla || style="background: #E8D8FF" | Holden Cruze L || not available || style="background: #FFE2B7" | Nissan Navara || colspan="3" | not available 
|-
| 2012 || style="background: #E8D8FF" | Mazda3 || style="background: #FFE2B7" | Toyota HiLux || style="background: #E8D8FF" | Toyota Corolla || style="background: #DCDCDC" | Holden Commodore L || style="background: #E8D8FF" | Holden Cruze L || style="background: #E8D8FF" | Hyundai i30 || style="background: #E8D8FF" | Toyota Camry L || style="background: #FFE2B7" | Nissan Navara || style="background: #D9EBFF" | Toyota Yaris || style="background: #E8D8FF" | Ford Focus L 
|-
| 2013 || style="background: #E8D8FF" | Toyota Corolla || style="background: #E8D8FF" | Mazda3 || style="background: #FFE2B7" | Toyota HiLux || style="background: #E8D8FF" | Hyundai i30 || style="background: #DCDCDC" | Holden Commodore L || not available || style="background: #FFE2B7" | Mitsubishi Triton || colspan="2" | not available || style="background: #FFE2B7" | Ford Ranger L 
|-
| 2014 || style="background: #E8D8FF" | Toyota Corolla || style="background: #E8D8FF" | Mazda3 || style="background: #FFE2B7" | Toyota HiLux || style="background: #E8D8FF" | Hyundai i30 || style="background: #DCDCDC" | Holden Commodore L || style="background: #FFE2B7" | Ford Ranger L || colspan="2" | not available || style="background: #FFD9D9" | Mazda CX-5 || style="background: #E8D8FF" | Volkswagen Golf 
|-
| 2015 || style="background: #E8D8FF" | Toyota Corolla || style="background: #E8D8FF" | Mazda3 || style="background: #FFE2B7" | Toyota HiLux || style="background: #E8D8FF" | Hyundai i30 || style="background: #FFE2B7" | Ford Ranger L || style="background: #DCDCDC" | Holden Commodore L || style="background: #E8D8FF" | Toyota Camry L || style="background: #FFE2B7" | Mitsubishi Triton || style="background: #FFD9D9" | Mazda CX-5 || style="background: #E8D8FF" | Volkswagen Golf 
|-
| 2016 || style="background: #FFE2B7" | Toyota HiLux || style="background: #E8D8FF" | Toyota Corolla || style="background: #E8D8FF" | Hyundai i30 || style="background: #FFE2B7" | Ford Ranger L || style="background: #E8D8FF" | Mazda3 || style="background: #E8D8FF" | Toyota Camry L || style="background: #DCDCDC" | Holden Commodore L || style="background: #FFD9D9" | Mazda CX-5 || colspan="2" | not available 
|-
| 2017 || style="background: #FFE2B7" | Toyota HiLux || style="background: #FFE2B7" | Ford Ranger L || style="background: #E8D8FF" | Toyota Corolla || style="background: #E8D8FF" | Mazda3 || style="background: #E8D8FF" | Hyundai i30 || style="background: #FFD9D9" | Mazda CX-5 || style="background: #FFD9D9" | Hyundai Tucson || colspan="3" | not available 
|-
| 2018 || style="background: #FFE2B7" | Toyota HiLux || style="background: #FFE2B7" | Ford Ranger L || style="background: #E8D8FF" | Toyota Corolla || style="background: #E8D8FF" | Mazda3 || style="background: #E8D8FF" | Hyundai i30 || style="background: #FFD9D9" | Mazda CX-5 || style="background: #FFE2B7" | Mitsubishi Triton || style="background: #FFD9D9" | Toyota RAV4 || style="background: #FFD9D9" | Nissan X-Trail || style="background: #E8D8FF" | Volkswagen Golf 
|-
| 2019 || style="background: #FFE2B7" | Toyota HiLux || style="background: #FFE2B7" | Ford Ranger L || style="background: #E8D8FF" | Toyota Corolla || style="background: #E8D8FF" | Hyundai i30 || style="background: #FFE2B7" | Mitsubishi Triton || style="background: #FFD9D9" | Mazda CX-5 || style="background: #E8D8FF" | Mazda3 || style="background: #FFD9D9" | Toyota RAV4 || style="background: #E8D8FF" | Kia Cerato || style="background: #FFD9D9" | Mitsubishi ASX 
|-
| 2020 || style="background: #FFE2B7" | Toyota HiLux || style="background: #FFE2B7" | Ford Ranger L || style="background: #FFD9D9" | Toyota RAV4 || style="background: #E8D8FF" | Toyota Corolla || style="background: #FFD9D9" | Mazda CX-5 || style="background: #E8D8FF" | Hyundai i30 || style="background: #FFE2B7" | Mitsubishi Triton || style="background: #FFD9D9" | Toyota Prado || style="background: #E8D8FF" | Kia Cerato || style="background: #FFD9D9" | Hyundai Tucson 
| |-
! !! style="width:8%;" | 1st !! style="width:8%;" | 2nd !! style="width:8%;" | 3rd !! style="width:8%;" | 4th !! style="width:8%;" | 5th !! style="width:8%;" | 6th !! style="width:8%;" | 7th !! style="width:8%;" | 8th !! style="width:8%;" | 9th !! style="width:8%;" | 10th 
|-
| colspan="11" | See also : Best-selling models in 
|-
|}

Large scale manufacturers
Current

The current mainstream automotive manufacturers in Australia all build heavy vehicles. Large scale production of light vehicles ended with the departure of Holden.

Bustech

Bustech has manufactured buses on the Gold Coast, Queensland since 1998.

Denning Manufacturing

Denning Manufacturing has manufactured buses in Brisbane since 2004

Iveco

Iveco Australia is a subsidiary of CNH Industrial and was formed after the takeover of International Trucks. It currently produces the Iveco PowerStar in a number of variants and, up until 2020, the venerable ACCO. It is known for being the only foreign semi truck maker that isn't producing an American branded Conventional semi truck.

IVECO Australia has announced it will cease local manufacturing at its Dandenong plant from mid-2022.Kenworth

Kenworth Australia is a wholly owned subsidiary of Paccar Inc.

Kenworth are currently the largest single-nameplate manufacturer in Australia.

Kenworth began Australian production in 1971 and mainly manufactures heavy duty semi trucks specifically for the Australian and New Zealand markets at their plant in Bayswater, Victoria.

In 2018, Paccar began assembly of DAF Trucks from a facility next to Kenworth. 

Mack
Mack trucks have been manufactured in Australia since 1963, starting at Richlands, Queensland.

On 26 April 2000, Volvo acquired the truck and bus arm of Renault. This sale included Mack. Volvo Group Australia moved Mack production into their Wacol facility not long after.

Volvo

Volvo Group Australia began Australian production in Wacol, Queensland in 1972.

After the acquisition of Mack in April 2000, both manufacturers were merged into the one facility at Wacol. This is now the largest vehicle plant in Australia.

Previous
Australian Motor Industries
 

Founded in 1926, Australian Motor Industries (AMI) began assembly operations in 1952. It produced a wide range of Standard, Triumph, Mercedes-Benz cars, as well as variety of Rambler models from American Motors Corporation (AMC) up to 1987. Assembly of Toyota automobiles began in 1963. The Japanese company took a controlling interest in AMI in 1968 and increased its investment until AMI renamed itself as AMI Toyota Ltd in 1985.

British Leyland
 

British Leyland assembled and manufactured vehicles in Australia from 1950 to 1975. British Leyland was formed when Leyland Motors and British Motor Holdings (formerly BMC) merged.

Chrysler Australia

Chrysler departed the Australian car market in 1981 when it sold the remainder of its shareholding in Chrysler Australia Ltd to the Mitsubishi Motor Corporation of Japan. The new owner renamed the company Mitsubishi Motors Australia (MMA) and this company continues to operate today as one of Australia's major importers of road vehicles. However, local production of passenger vehicles was discontinued in March 2008. During the 1970s, Chrysler began working closely with Mitsubishi Motors Corporation after they acquired a 15 percent interest in the company in 1971, with the result that Chrysler Australia began building Mitsubishi-designed Chrysler-branded vehicles such as the Chrysler Valiant Galant (1972–1977 Mitsubishi Galant) and the Chrysler Sigma (1977–1985 Mitsubishi Galant). The Tonsley Park plant was sold to Mitsubishi Motors Corporation and was run by Mitsubishi Motors Australia after Chrysler pulled out of Australian manufacturing in 1980. Production of the popular Sigma and Colt range of vehicles continued under the Mitsubishi name until the late-1980s, when production was switched exclusively to the Magna.

Ford Australia

Ford Australia is the Australian subsidiary of Ford Motor Company and was founded in Geelong in 1925 as an outpost of Ford Motor Company of Canada, Limited. At that time, Ford Canada was a separate company from Ford USA. Henry Ford had granted the manufacturing rights to Ford in British Empire (later Commonwealth) countries (excepting the UK) to Canadian investors. Ford Australia also has a performance car division, Ford Performance Vehicles, with the cars being marketed under the FPV brand. In May 2013 Ford announced that it will end Australian production in October 2016, but will remain as a competitor in the Australian marketplace with imported vehicles. All factories had closed by 20 October 2016.
 		 

Holden

Holden was an Australian automaker based in Elizabeth, South Australia. After local production ended in 2017, the company became an importer of GM-branded motor vehicles. The company was founded in 1856 as a saddlery business in Adelaide, South Australia, but later moved into the automotive field, becoming a subsidiary of General Motors (GM) in 1931. Holden has taken charge of vehicle operations for GM in Australasia and, on behalf of GM, holds partial ownership of GM Korea (formerly GM Daewoo) in South Korea. Over the years, Holden has offered a broad range of original, locally produced vehicles (such as the Holden Commodore), supplemented by imported GM models. In the past, Holden had offered badge-engineered Chevrolet, Isuzu, Nissan, Suzuki, Toyota, and Vauxhall Motors models in sharing arrangements, with Daewoo, Opel, and Isuzu-sourced models sold in later years. Holden also had a performance vehicle partner, Holden Special Vehicles, which marketed modified Holdens under the HSV brand. In December 2013, Holden announced they would end their local manufacturing operations in Australia on 20 October 2017. After the closure of its production plant in Elizabeth, South Australia, Holden changed its business focus to car styling and importing. The Holden brand name was retired in 2020 and dealers compensated as they were shut down.

Leader Trucks

Leader Trucks was a truck manufacturing company based in Toowoomba, Queensland, Australia. It was established as an initiative of Cyril Anderson and Western Transport. Nearly 2,000 trucks were manufactured between 1972 and 1984.

Mitsubishi Motors Australia

Mitsubishi Motors Australia (MMA) is a fully owned subsidiary of parent company Mitsubishi Motors Corporation of Japan. A site in Tonsley, South Australia was the location of MMA's vehicle assembly plant. The plant was closed in March 2008 when lacklustre sales of the large Mitsubishi 380 confirmed that domestic vehicle manufacturing was no longer viable.

Nissan Australia

Nissan first began assembling cars in 1966, when Pressed Metal Corporation began assembly of the Datsun Bluebird 1300. This deal ended after about a year and a half, however, but by 1968 Motor Producers Ltd. of Melbourne began assembling Datsuns again at their Clayton plant. By 1971 locally assembled cars were to include the 1200 and 1600 saloons, with at least 60% local parts content. A deal lasting until 1976 was signed with Motor Producers.

Nissan used the Clayton factory to build cars in the wake of the 1973 oil crisis. Models produced in Australia included the Pulsar, Pintara, and Skyline. By the end of the 1980s however, Nissan was facing financial difficulties, while Nissan's local car assembly lines closed in 1992.

Renault Australia
Renault (Australia) Pty Ltd was established in the late 1950s to organise the importation and contract assembly of Renault vehicles in Australia. In August 1966 Renault Australia purchased the assembly facilities of Continental and General Distributors at Heidelberg in Victoria. Models including the Renault 10, 12, 16 and 18 were assembled and the company also entered into an agreement to assemble cars for Peugeot. Australian production ended with the closure of the Heidelberg plant in July 1981 with LNC Industries then taking over importation and distribution of Renaults in Australia. As of 2012, Renault vehicles are sold in Australia through Vehicle Distributors Australia, a wholly owned subsidiary of Nissan Australia. 

Rootes Australia

Rootes Australia produced a range of Hillman, Humber, and Singer automobiles in Australia between 1946 and 1965. In December 1965, Rootes Australia was merged with Chrysler Australia.

Toyota Australia

Toyota Motor Corporation Australia (TMCA), is a subsidiary of Toyota Motor Corporation, which is based in Japan. TMCA first began in 1958, TA markets Toyota products and manages motorsport, advertising and business operations for Toyota Motor Corporation in Australia. TA is also responsible for Lexus vehicles in Australia.

On 10 February 2014, Toyota announced it would cease manufacturing vehicles and engines in Australia. The Altona plant was closed on 3 October 2017, marking the end of locally produced Toyota vehicles in Australia.

Volkswagen Australia
 
Volkswagen Australia Pty Ltd was formed in 1954 by Volkswagen of Germany and various Australian state Volkswagen distributors. The company acquired a suitable site from Martin & King situated at Clayton having facilities for CKD vehicle assembly in Victoria, that site having been used for local assembly of the Volkswagen Beetle since 1954. By 1960, sheet metal panels were being pressed at Clayton, and by 1967 the engine and most components were being produced there.

In 1967 Volkswagen Australia developed a unique model, the Country Buggy, which used components from the Beetle and the Kombi. This local design was later also manufactured in the Philippines.

Due to falling sales, the operation reverted to assembly only in 1968. A new company, Motor Producers Limited, was formed and operations were expanded to include Datsun and Volvo models as well as Volkswagens. The factory was sold to Nissan in 1976 and Australian assembly of Volkswagens ended shortly after.

Western Star

Western Star began assembly of kit trucks in 1983 at the former White Trucks factory in Wacol, Queensland. The kits were imported from Kelowna, BC Canada. This continued until 1992, when fully built trucks were imported from Canada.

Small-scale producers

There are a number of current, previous or future small scale producers of cars in Australia, including;

Absolute Pace (1990–no longer present)
ACE EV (2018 – present))
Alpha Sports
Amuza
Ascort (1958–1960)
Australian Six (1919–1930)
Australis (1897–1907)
Austral
Birchfield (2003–present)
Birrana
Blade Electric Vehicles
Bolwell (1963–present)1962 and 1979
Bomac
Borland Racing Developments
Bowin Cars (1968–1976)
Brabham Automotive (2017–present)
Buchanan
Buckle Motors
Bullet (1996–present)
Bushranger
Caldwell Vale (1907–1913)
Canstel
Carbontech (1999–present)
Cheetah Racing Cars
Chic (circa 1920s)
Classic Glass
Classic Revival (1989–present)
Cobra Craft
Custom Buses
Daktari 
Daytona (2002–present)
Denning
Deuce Customs (1979–present)
Devaux (2001–present)
DRB Sports Cars (1997–present)
E-Vade
Elfin (1958–present)
Evans
Finch
G-Force (1986–present)
Giocattolo (1986–1989)
Goggomobile (1958–1961)
Hartnett (1949–1955)
Harden Electric Vehicles (2020 – present)
Homebush
Ilinga (1974–1975)
Joss
Kraftwerkz (2002–present)
Lightburn (1963–1965)
Lloyd-Hartnett
Matich (1967–1974)
Minetti Sports Cars
Nasenbaer
Nota (1955–present)
OKA
Pellandini Cars (1970–1978)
Pioneer  (1897–1898)
Piper
PMC Australia\Ansair
PRB
Purvis (1974–1991)
Python (1981–present)
Ralt
RCM 
Rennmax (1962–1978)
RFW
RMC
Roaring Forties (1997–present)
Robnell
Sharpbuilt
Shrike (1988–1991)
Skelta (2004–present)
Southern Cross (1931–1935)
Studebaker (1960-1966)
Tomcar (2005 – present)
White Pointer (car)

Tuning companies

Current tuning or customisation companies in Australia include:

Holden Special Vehicles (HSV) – the official performance vehicle partner of Holden
Tekno Autosports
Tickford Racing
Walkinshaw Performance – authorised Holden Special Vehicles and Hummer tuning company
Corsa Specialised Vehicles* (CSV''') is a small-scale automaker established in 1994 that is based in Mildura, Australia. Its range consists of V8 engine high performance cars based on those produced by Holden.

Past tuning companies
Dick Johnson Racing
Ford Tickford Experience (FTE) – former official performance vehicle partner of Ford Australia (1991–2002)
Ford Performance Vehicles (FPV) – Ford Australia's in-house tuning company (2002–2014)
HDT Special Vehicles (HDT) – former Holden tuning company (manufacturing arm of the Holden Dealer Team)
Wayne Gardner Racing

See also

 Manufacturing in Australia
 Button car plan
 Automotive industry in New Zealand
 Deindustrialization

References